This is a list of flag bearers who have represented Mongolia at the Olympics.

Flag bearers carry the national flag of their country at the opening ceremony of the Olympic Games.

See also
Mongolia at the Olympics

References

Mongolia at the Olympics
Mongolia
Olympic flagbearers
Olympics